Snejina Gogova (Bulgarian: Снежина Гогова) (born 1937) is Bulgarian Sinologist, sociolinguist, and psycholinguist, and Professor of Chinese Linguistics at the Faculty of Classical and Modern Philologies of Sofia University. Gogova published in English and Chinese between 1985 and 2001 and in Russian and Bulgarian from 1970 to 2009.

References

Living people
1937 births
Bulgarian sinologists
Academic staff of Sofia University

zh:汉学家